Simon Mahon (4 April 1914 – 19 October 1986) was a British Labour Party politician.

Biography
Simon Mahon was born into a prominent Roman Catholic family of Irish descent in Bootle. His father, Alderman Simon Mahon (1886–1961), was a mayor of Bootle who ran for Liverpool Exchange MP in 1935.<ref>"Bootle loses a great worker by the death of Alderman Simon Mahon",
'Bootle Times, 12 May 1961.</ref> His brother, Peter, was elected MP for Preston South in 1964. His great-nephew, Peter Dowd, has been the Labour MP for the Bootle constituency since 2015, and served in the Shadow Cabinet under Jeremy Corbyn until 2020.

Mahon was educated at St Joseph's Irish Christian Brothers school and at St James' School, Bootle. He became a general contractor. Mahon was a councillor and later an alderman of Bootle Borough Council and was chairman of the housing committee and Mayor of Bootle from 1962 to 1963. He was chairman of Bootle Trades Council and Labour Party. Mahon was Member of Parliament for Bootle from 1955 to 1979. He served as an opposition whip from 1959 to 1961.

In 1968, Mahon and his brother, Peter, together with another Catholic Labour MP, Walter Alldritt, threatened to resign the Whip. They had taken exception to remarks made by Douglas Houghton, Chairman of the Parliamentary Labour Party, that large families were a form of "social irresponsibility". Only a midnight meeting with Prime Minister Harold Wilson and a written statement that Houghton's views were not party policy dissuaded the MPs from carrying out their threat.

In 1969, Mahon was created a Papal Knight. Upon returning from his investiture Mass to the House of Commons, he was prevented from entering the Chamber by the Sergeant at Arms until he divested himself of his ceremonial sword. In 1978, Mahon wrote a letter of protest to Ladbrokes, complaining of their "appalling taste" in opening a book on the successor to Pope Paul VI.

Personal life
Mahon married Veronica Robertshaw in 1941; the couple had no children. After his retirement, Mahon moved to live in Crosby, where he died in 1986, aged 72.

References

SourcesTimes Guide to the House of Commons October 1974''

External links 
 

1914 births
1986 deaths
Councillors in Merseyside
Labour Party (UK) MPs for English constituencies
UK MPs 1955–1959
UK MPs 1959–1964
UK MPs 1964–1966
UK MPs 1966–1970
UK MPs 1970–1974
UK MPs 1974
UK MPs 1974–1979
Politicians from Liverpool
English people of Irish descent
English Roman Catholics